Mangifera kemanga is a large tree in the family Anacardiaceae. It is native to rainforests in Southeast Asia and found especially on inundated soils and in marshes. This tree is closely related to Mangifera caesia.

References

kemanga
Flora of Thailand
Flora of Malaya
Flora of Sumatra
Tropical fruit